Álvaro Vilela Jurandir (born 19 December 1938) is a Brazilian former footballer who competed in the 1960 Summer Olympics.

References

1938 births
Living people
Association football defenders
Brazilian footballers
Olympic footballers of Brazil
Footballers at the 1960 Summer Olympics
Marília Atlético Clube players